is a Japanese judoka.

She competed at the 2013 World Judo Championships in Rio de Janeiro, where she placed fifth in the -58 class.

She was part of the Japanese team that won gold medals in the world championship team competitions in 2013 and 2015.

References

External links
 

1994 births
Living people
Japanese female judoka
Asian Games medalists in judo
Judoka at the 2014 Asian Games
Asian Games gold medalists for Japan
Medalists at the 2014 Asian Games
Universiade gold medalists for Japan
Universiade bronze medalists for Japan
Universiade medalists in judo
Medalists at the 2015 Summer Universiade
21st-century Japanese women